Mitemcinal (GM-611 or 3'-N-dimethyl-11-deoxy-3'-N-isopropyl-12-O-methyl-11-oxo-8,9-didehydroerythromycin) is a motilin agonist derived from the macrolide antibiotic, erythromycin.  It was discovered in the labs of Chugai Pharma. Mitemcinal is orally administered and it is believed to have strong promotility (or prokinetic) effects.  Promotility drugs relieve symptoms of reflux by speeding the clearance of acid from the oesophagus and stomach. The parent compound, erythromycin, has these characteristics, but mitemcinal lacks the antibiotic properties of erythromycin.

Presently, erythromycin is commonly used off-label for gastric motility indications such as gastroparesis. If mitemcinal can be shown to be as effective a promotility agent, it would represent a significant advance in the GI field as treatment with this drug would not carry the risk of unintentional selection of antibiotic-resistant bacteria.  This concept greatly intrigued Chugai, and the company pursued it as an ideal candidate for a long-term prokinetic agent to treat lower gastrointestinal deficiencies including gastroparesis.

The Phase II trials did not detect an increase in gastric emptying among the population of diabetic gastroparesis patients above placebo.  Thus, although Chugai was able to demonstrate the required safety of the compound, development of this drug has stalled due to a lack of convincing efficacy data.

Notes and references

Macrolides